Ralph Willett Miller (24 January 1762 – 14 May 1799) was an officer of the Royal Navy. He served during the American Revolutionary and the French Revolutionary Wars, eventually rising to the rank of Captain. He was one of Vice-Admiral Horatio Nelson's Band of Brothers at the Battle of the Nile in 1798.

Family and early life
Miller was born on 24 January 1762, the son of an American loyalist. His family's allegiance during the American Revolution caused the loss of their property and possessions. Miller was sent to England and entered the navy in 1778, serving aboard  with the fleet under Rear-Admiral James Gambier. He later served during the war as part of fleets under Samuel Barrington, George Rodney, Samuel Hood and Thomas Graves. He fought in a number of engagements, and was wounded three times. He served under Commodore William Hotham, and after the Battle of Fort Royal, Miller was promoted by Rodney to be lieutenant aboard . He was present at the Battle of the Chesapeake on 5 September 1781, during which the Terrible was badly damaged, and later scuttled. Miller returned to the West Indies with Hood, and from there he went to England, arriving in late 1782, and by 20 December he was serving aboard .

French Revolutionary Wars
By the outbreak of the wars with revolutionary France Miller was aboard the 98-gun second rate  in the Mediterranean. After the end of the Siege of Toulon, Sir Sidney Smith placed Miller in charge of destroying the French ships and the arsenal. 

He volunteered to lead an assault on the French ships moored at Golfe Jouan, and was appointed to command Poulette and ordered to fit her as fireship, with the intention of firing the fleet. He eventually made five attempts to take her into the anchorage, but the wind prevented him on each occasion. He was assigned to command HMS Mignonne on 12 January 1796, but the commander in chief, Sir John Jervis instead moved him to HMS Unite.

Jervis assigned Miller to the Adriatic, but on the arrival of Commodore Horatio Nelson, Miller became Nelson's flag captain aboard . Miller commanded Captain at the Battle of Cape St Vincent on 14 February 1797.  He followed Nelson aboard  in May 1797, and was with him during his time with the inshore squadron. He participated in the assault on Cádiz in June, and was involved in the unsuccessful Battle of Santa Cruz de Tenerife in July, Miller leading the landing parties from Theseus.

Miller and the Theseus were assigned to sail under Nelson, by now aboard . Miller was therefore present at the Battle of the Nile on 1 August, where he was wounded in the face, and was afterwards sent to Gibraltar with Captain Sir James Saumarez, in command of the captured French prizes. Miller and the Theseus returned to the Eastern Mediterranean in December, now acting as part of Sir Sidney Smith's fleet. He supported Smith at the Siege of Acre, and bombarded French positions between Acre and Jaffa.

Death
News had reached Smith that a number of French frigates were preparing to sail from Alexandria to Jaffa to deliver stores and weapons for the French army. Smith ordered Miller to intercept them. Miller was preparing his ship to depart when an unknown accident occurred. Lieutenant England wrote in a report to Sir Sidney Smith It is with extreme concern I have to acquaint you, that yesterday morning, at half-past nine o'clock, twenty 36-howitzer shells, and fifty 18-pounder shells, had been got up and prepared ready for service by Captain Miller's order...when in an instant...the whole was on fire and a dreadful explosion took place. The ship was severely damaged, her aft part almost totally destroyed and the rest on fire. The crew fought the fire and were able to save the ship, but as Lieutenant England reported Our loss from the explosion, I here lament, has been very great; and Captain Miller, I am sorry to add, is of the number killed, which amount to 20; drowned, 9; and 45 wounded.

Nelson wrote on learning of Miller's death that he is not only a most excellent and gallant officer, but the only truly virtuous man that I ever saw. Another of Nelson's band of brothers who had fought at the Nile, Edward Berry, suggested that a memorial to Miller be created. Nelson supported the proposal, and one was sculpted by John Flaxman, and installed in St Paul's Cathedral. Miller left a widow and two young daughters. The government awarded his family a pension of £100 a year.

Notes

References
 
 
 

1762 births
1799 deaths
Royal Navy officers
Royal Navy personnel of the American Revolutionary War
Royal Navy personnel of the French Revolutionary Wars
Accidental deaths in Israel
Military personnel from New York City